Cankuzo is a city located in eastern Burundi. It is the capital city of Cankuzo Province.

Populated places in Burundi